Christopher Nash may refer to:

 Chris Nash (born 1983), English cricketer
 Christopher Nash (sailor) (born 1952), Bermudian sailor
 Christopher Columbus Nash (1838–?), merchant and a Democratic sheriff in Grant Parish, Louisiana